Dr Kota Neelima is an Indian author, researcher, political commentator, artist and politician. Her writing, art, and academic work include a focus on the themes of rural distress, gender, farmer suicides, and the peripheries of democratic societies. She lives in Hyderabad, Telangana.

Early life and education
Neelima was born to the journalist and author, Late Shri K.V.S. Rama Sarma, and Uma Sarma in Andhra Pradesh. She obtained a Ph.D in Political Science from University of Delhi, and a Master of Arts in International Relations from the Jawaharlal Nehru University, Delhi. Neelima has also been a Senior Research Fellow, South Asia Studies at the Paul H. Nitze School of Advanced International Studies (SAIS), Johns Hopkins University, Washington DC. She also studied at the Academy of Fine Arts and Literature led by Arpana Caur.

Research and writing
Neelima has written books on the poor and women in India in both genres of fiction and non-fiction. Her novels Riverstones and Moneylender are based on rural farmers in India, and her novel Shoes of the Dead includes a focus on farmer suicides. In 2016, filmmaker Vetrimaaran optioned Shoes of The Dead to be adapted into a film. Her novel The Honest Season is a political thriller with a female journalist as the lead character.

Her non-fiction book Widows of Vidarbha: Making of Shadows is about the life of widows after the suicides of their farmer husbands due to agriculture distress in Vidarbha region of Maharashtra. In a review for the Hindustan Times, Manjula Narayan writes, "The writing is taut, often ironic, and devoid of unnecessary adjectives and stylistic flourishes. Instead, the author allows the women to speak, putting down the nuances of each of their stories, almost editing herself out. The result is a book that's filled with stark pain, one that's almost unbearably honest." Her non-fiction works also include two books on spirituality. One of them, Tirupati: A Guide to Life has been translated to Hindi, Telugu and Tamil languages.

As a journalist, Neelima covered politics as a principal correspondent for The Indian Express and was the Political Editor of The Sunday Guardian. Neelima writes in Economic and Political Weekly, The Huffington Post India, The Quint, The Wire, DNA, and Hindustan Times. Her research organization, Institute of Perception Studies (IPS), maps rural distress and advocates for solutions, and is also the founder of Rate The Debate, a campaign about media reforms. She is also heading Hakku Initiative, Hyderabad, which is a campaign-based and solution-oriented initiative, some of its campaigns are 'Is Hyderabad Monsoon Ready?.', Citizen Safety and Wine Shops', Sanitation Warriors of Hyderabad, Wall Against Citizens, Paddy Farmers of Telangana, Close Drain Save Lifes, Citizen Referendum on Wine Shops in Hyderabad.  Her academic articles are on distress, farmer suicides and reforms on electoral system in India, such as 'Right to Recall'. She also speaks at academic institutions on topics including agricultural crisis and gender. She was awarded in the Exceptional Women of Excellence category at the Women Economic Forum (WEF) 2019. Her initiative StudioAdda conducts periodic outreach events like art and photography shows, and discussions on social, economic and political conditions of India.

Neelima also participates in literary festivals, including the Jaipur Literary Festival, Apeejay Kolkata Literary Festival, Dehradun Literature Festival, Odisha Literary Festival, Times LitFest, OotyLitFest  Times LitFest, and Delhi Literary Festival.

Publications

Non-fiction books
 Tirupati: A Guide to Life, Penguin (2012) 
 Tirumala: Sacred Foods of God, Roli Publications (2017) 
 Widows of Vidarbha Making of Shadows, Oxford University Press, (2018)

Fiction books
 Riverstones, Penguin (Reprint/2016)  
 Death of a Moneylender, Penguin (Reprint/2016) 
 Shoes of the Dead, Rupa Publications (2013) 
 The Honest Season, Penguin (2015)

Chapter in edited books
"Tirupati: The God for a Modern Age" in Travelling In, Travelling Out: A Book of Unexpected Journeys Edited by Namita Gokhale (2014)

Articles
 Widows of Farmer Suicide Victims in Vidarbha, Economic and Political Weekly, Vol.53, Issue No. 26-27, 30 June 2018, pp. 24–31.
 'Right to Recall' Reform Experience in Madhya Pradesh, Economic and Political Weekly, Vol.LII, No. 13, 1 April 2017, pp. 24–26.

Painting and photography
Neelima is also a painter whose work often incorporates charcoal sketching before paint. In 2017, in her exhibition Remains of Ayodhya, Places of Worship, she reflected on Ayodhya and related themes of freedom and harmony. In 2018, Swati Rai wrote for The Tribune, "As an artist, her paintings abound in minimalism, which is a clear and consistent element in her art." Her 2018 exhibition Metaphors of the Moon was influenced by her work on her book Widows of Vidarbha: Making of Shadows, which documented the lives of widows after the suicides of their farmer husbands. In a review of the exhibit, Shilpa R writes, "The concept of negotiating and documenting the absence in and around us has been a recurring motif in the author-painter's oeuvre. [...] As is her wont, Neelima has always turned to the creative medium to draw attention to what she felt was left unsaid in the written word." 

In 2019, sales proceeds from her ninth solo exhibition, a photography exhibit titled The Nature of Things: Death and Dualism in Indian Villages that is part of her research for Azim Premji University, Bengaluru, were donated to farmers' widows. 

Her works have been featured at the Lalit Kala Akademi and the India Habitat Centre in Delhi, and in art shows in Mumbai, Bangalore, Kolkata, among other cities in India. Her works have also been featured at several international exhibitions, including The Nehru Centre, London, Museum, and China Art Museum, National Museum of Fine Arts, Bishkek, Kyrgyzstan. Her works are part of the permanent collection in Museum of Sacred Arts, Belgium.

Personal life
Neelima is the wife of Congress party spokesperson Pawan Khera. She has served as General Secretary, Telangana Pradesh Congress Committee.

See also
 List of Indian writers
 List of Indian women writers
 List of Indian women artists

References

External links
 
 The Honest Season excerpt (Scroll.in, 2015)

Living people
Year of birth missing (living people)
21st-century Indian women writers
21st-century Indian women artists
English-language writers from India
Writers from Delhi
20th-century Indian journalists
Indian novelists
Jawaharlal Nehru University alumni